Jab Adu (December 28, 1932 - 2016), born Joseph Abiodun Babajide, was an actor and producer from Nigeria. He directed the 1977 Nigerian film Bisi, Daughter of the River, the highest grossing film in Nigeria for several decades. He was among the pioneers of Nigerian filmmaking.

He was born in Calabar. From 1941 until 1946 he studied at St. Gregory's College in the Obalende neighborhood of Lagos.

Filmography

Actor
Countdown at Kusini (1976) as Juma Bukari
Saworoide (1999) as Lagbayi
The Village Headmaster (1968 - 1988), a soap opera, as Bassey Okon

Director
Bisi, Daughter of the River (1977)

References

1932 births
2016 deaths
Nigerian film directors
Nigerian television actors
20th-century Nigerian male actors
21st-century Nigerian male actors
Nigerian male film actors